Oum El Ghaït Benessahraoui, better known as Oum (born 18 April 1978 in Casablanca), is a Moroccan singer-songwriter. Considered an ambassador of Moroccan culture, she mixes hassani, jazz, gospel, soul, afrobeat and Sufi music influences in her songs.

Biography
At a very young age, Oum joined a gospel choir where she played her first solos at fourteen with a voice that impressed listeners.

At seventeen, her first song, "This is your heart" that she wrote to support the charity operation "Les malades du cœur", helped to successfully secure her first appearance on television.

In 1996, she entered the National School of Architecture in Rabat. She pursued her studies there until graduation in 2002.

At the same time, she began to perform in public. With a powerful and expressive voice, she takes over the repertoire of Aretha Franklin, Ella Fitzgerald or Whitney Houston.

In 1998, Oum did her first attempts with hip-hop and RnB with Djo Catangana, a producer and creator of the French hip hop collective Mafia Trece.

In 2002, she was noticed by Philippe Delmas, who invited her to Paris. For two years, she alternated recording sessions and concerts in Casablanca with the Brotherhood band. In 2004, she ended her Parisian period.

Back in Morocco, she entered new musical universes: the Gnaoui and the Hassani. Oum's decision to introduce such local forms of rhythms not only influenced her songs' tunes but also her lyrics. She performed with Barry, a musician known for his fusion of musical styles and repertoires, on the stages of the Gnaoua World Music Festival in Essaouira, the Tanjazz in Tangier, and the Barcelona Acció Musical in Barcelona.

Oum, who grew up in Marrakech, is a soul singer. Yet, her style remains unique since it is highly inspired by influences such as the Hassani poetry (Moroccan desert culture) and African rhythms.

Her first album Lik 'Oum appeared in Casablanca in May 2009.

Whowa means "him" in dialectical Moroccan Darija in the first single from her second album Sweerty -means "luck" in Moroccan dialectical Arabic (Darija). It was released with a video clip in January 2010. In July 2012, she released Harguin, a collaboration with Blitz the Ambassador on the theme of illegal immigration from sub-Saharan Africa. Sweerty was released in 2012.

Oum was invited to the UNESCO headquarters in Paris on the occasion of International Women's Day to give a concert on 7 March 2012.

She was invited in June 2013 to take part in the Gnaoua World Music Festival in Essaouira (Morocco).

In September 2015, she released her fourth album: Zarabi, which means "carpets" in Moroccan Darija and it is a tribute to the carpet weavers of the village of M'Hamid El Ghizlane. She wrote and co-directed it with Mathis Haug. Yacir Rami accompanied her on the Oud and Rhani Krija on the percussions.

Her song "Taragalte", from the album Soul of Morocco, was used in the 2018 movie Beirut.

Discography

Albums 
Lik'Oum (2009)

Sweerty (2012)

Soul of Morocco(2013)

Zarabi (2015)

Daba (2020)

Singles 
 Oum featuring Barry : Dear Mamma (2003)
 Hamdoullah (2004)
 Daym Allah (2004)
 Africa (2004})
 Humilité (2005)
 La Ti'ass feat. H. Kayne (2008)
 Hip Hop Exchange Featuring H-Kayne & Tote King (2009)
 Lik (2009)
 Oum featuring Don Bigg : Lik (2010)
 Taragalte (Soul of Morocco) (2013)

References

External links 
 
 
  

1978 births
21st-century Moroccan women singers
Living people